The 1952 Cal Poly Mustangs football team represented California Polytechnic State College—now known as California Polytechnic State University, San Luis Obispo—as a member of the California Collegiate Athletic Association (CCAA) during the 1952 college football season. Led by third-year head coach LeRoy Hughes, Cal Poly compiled an overall record of 7–3 with a mark of 4–0 in conference play, winning the CCAA title. The Mustangs played home games at Mustang Stadium in San Luis Obispo, California.

Schedule

Notes

References

Cal Poly
Cal Poly Mustangs football seasons
California Collegiate Athletic Association football champion seasons
Cal Poly Mustangs football